Kawanabe Kyōsui (河鍋 暁翠, January 4, 1868 – May 7, 1935) was a Meiji era painter for nihonga and ukiyoe.

Early Training 
Kyōsui learned painting with her father Kawanabe Kyōsai. Kyōsui encouraged his students to copy his work carefully to become proficient. As one of his students, Kyōsui became adept at this, producing works that to this day are indistinguishable from her father's, created in his name.

Paintings 

Kyōsui specialized in genres such as devotional Buddhist paintings, bijin-ga images and scenes from noh and kyōgen theater.

She was accepted into the second Naikoku Kaiga Kyoshinkai (内国共進会, National Painting Competition) at age 17.

She also depicted room interiors.

A large collection of Kyōsui's work is housed in the Kawanabe Kyosai Memorial MuseumJa in Warabi in Saitama. Her work can also be found in the British Museum collection.

University professorship 
In 1902, the year after it opened, Kyōsui became the first female professor at the arts institution, Private Women's School of Fine Arts which later became Joshibi University of Art and Design.

References 

1861 births
1935 deaths
Japanese painters
Japanese women artists